Gangavati is a city, municipality and taluk in the Koppal district of the Indian state of Karnataka. It is one of the main commercial hubs in the Kalyana-Karnataka region. It is also the largest city, in terms of area and population, in the Koppal district.

Geography
It is a taluka (administrative division) of Koppal, a district that was previously part of Raichur.

Within Gangavathi Taluk are thirty-eight gram panchayats, or self-governing villages.

Economy
Gangavathi is a commercial center and a major focal point for the Rice Milling industry, with its rural areas being important for Paddy cultivation. Gangavati has Asia's first Rice Technology Park.

Demographics
According to the 2011 India census, Gangavathi had a population of 1,05,529. Males constituted 51% of the population and females 49%.  Gangavathi had an average literacy rate of 57%, lower than the national average of 59.5%: male literacy was 67%, and female literacy 48%.  In Gangavathi 15% of the population is under 6 years of age.

Landmarks

See also
Akalkumpi, Koppal
Hampi
Siddapur, Koppala
Anjandri hills

References

External links
 "Gangavathi City Municipal Council", Government of Karnataka
 "Gangavathi City Municipal Council" , Government of Karnataka

Cities and towns in Koppal district
Cities in Karnataka